Nagabhata may refer to either of two kings in India in the 8th and 9th centuries:
Nagabhata I - c 750–?
Nagabhata II - c 815–c 833